Summer in the Suburbs is a single television crime drama, written and devised by Tony Basgallop, that was broadcast on BBC Two on 10 January 2000. Described as an "intense murder drama", Summer in the Suburbs follows the story of a 14-year-old girl whose lifeless body is found in a field, and the lead detective, Ted Lyle (Aneirin Hughes), who investigates her death. As he and his wife Sandra are among local parents caught up in a wave of fear and suspicion, Ted's investigations uncover a shocking suspect. The programme was commissioned in August 1999 by then controller of BBC Two, Jane Root, and was directed by David Attwood and produced by Hilary Salmon.

Cast
 Aneirin Hughes as DC Ted Lyle
 Tessa Peake-Jones as Sandra Lyle
 Fred Pearson as Harold Lyle
 Sid Mitchell as James Lyle
 Ann Mitchell as Mulligan
 Sarah Alexander as Maisie
 Michael Bertenshaw as George Saunders
 Ryan Davenport as John Lyle
 Jemima Rooper as Julie Lyle
 Patrick Cremin as DS Greg Lipton
 Emily Corrie as Theresa Gibbs
 Joanne Leigh-Palmer as Leanne
 Elaine Donnelly as Helen Gibbs
 Neil Conrich as DCI Lawson
 Chad Gomez as Adam Keys
 Craig Vye as Guy
 Michael Tucek as Robbo
 Charles Simon as Terry
 Marcus Rogers as Bobby

References

External links

2000 television films
2000 films
2000 crime drama films
British crime drama films
BBC Film films
Films shot in Surrey
Films directed by David Attwood (film director)
2000s English-language films
2000s British films
British drama television films